Enamul Haque (1 March 1937 – 10 July 2022) was a Bangladeshi museologist. He was awarded Ekushey Padak in 2014 and Independence Day Award in 2017 by the Government of Bangladesh. In 2020, Haque was also awarded the Padma Shri award (India's 4th Highest civilian award) for his tremendous contribution in the field of archeology and museology by the Government of India.

Education and career
Haque completed his bachelor's in history and master's in archaeological history from the University of Dhaka. He later earned his PhD on South Asian Art from the University of Oxford. He got his post-graduate Diploma-in-Museology from London.

Haque joined Dhaka Museum (later Bangladesh National Museum) in 1962. He became the principal in 1965, director in 1969 and Director General during 1983–1991.

He was also elected as the President of the International Council of Museums Asia-Pacific Organization for the period 1983–86. He served as the professor of national culture and heritage in the Independent University, Bangladesh and the president, chairman and academic director of the International Centre for Study of Bengal Art.

Death
Haque died at his residence in Dhaka, Bangladesh, on 10 July 2022.

Honors and awards
 Bangladesh Shishu Academy Agrani Bank Literary Award (1986)
 Honorary International Councilor of the Asia Society of New York (1986–92)
 Ramaprasad Chanda Centenary Medal by the Asiatic Society of Calcutta (1993)
 D.Sc. honoris causa by Open University of Alternative Medicines of India (1998)
 Rich Foundation Award (2012)
 Ekushey Padak (2014)
 Independence Day Award (2017)
Padma Shri, India's fourth highest civilian award (2020)

Works
 Dhaka alias Jahangirnagar: 400 years (2009)

References

1937 births
2022 deaths
People from Bogra District
Museologists
University of Dhaka alumni
Alumni of the University of Oxford
Recipients of the Ekushey Padak
Recipients of the Independence Day Award
Recipients of the Padma Shri in other fields